Betelhem Makonnen (born 1972) is an Ethiopian American artist based in Austin, Texas.  She is a former curator for the Fusebox Festival and the 2019 Tito's Prize winner.

References

Living people
1972 births
Place of birth missing (living people)
Artists from Austin, Texas